Hendijan (also Romanized as Hendījān; also known as Hendeyān, Hendīān, Hindīān, and Hindijan) is a city and capital of Hendijan, Khuzestan Province, Iran.  At the 2016 census, its population was 29,015.

References

Populated places in Hendijan County

Cities in Khuzestan Province